Metamathics is the fourth album by the New Zealand post-rock band High Dependency Unit. It was released in New Zealand on April 14, 2008.

Track listing
 "Stupormodel"  – 5:08
 "Grace"  – 4:59
 "Tunguska"  – 7:04
 "The National Grid"  – 13:14
 "Irma Vep"  – 8:43
 "Wish We Were Here"  – 4:03

High Dependency Unit albums
2008 albums